Riccardo Favretto (Treviso, 18 October 2001) is an Italian rugby union player.
His usual position is as a Lock and he currently plays for Benetton in Pro14.

Under contract with Mogliano, for the last matches of 2019–20 Pro14 season and for 2020–21 Pro14 season, he was named as Permit Player for Benetton.

In 2020, Favretto was named in the Italy Under 20 squad.
From March 2021 he is also part of Italy squad. On the 14 October 2021, he was selected by Alessandro Troncon to be part of an Italy A 28-man squad for the 2021 end-of-year rugby union internationals.

References

External links

Living people
Sportspeople from Treviso
2001 births
Benetton Rugby players
Mogliano Rugby players
Italian rugby union players
Italy international rugby union players
Rugby union locks